The LinnDrum, also referred to as the LM-2, is a drum machine manufactured by Linn Electronics between 1982 and 1985. About 5,000 units were sold. 

Its high-quality samples, flexibility and affordability made the LinnDrum popular; it sold far more units than its predecessor (the LM-1) and its successor (the Linn 9000) combined. Roger Linn re-used the moniker on the LinnDrum Midistudio and the Roger Linn Designs' LinnDrum II. The LinnDrum was used on many recordings in the 1980s.

When Linn Electronics closed in 1986, Forat Electronics purchased its assets and offered service, sounds and modifications for the LinnDrum. The LinnDrum was pre-MIDI, using a DIN sync interface, but MIDI Retrofit Kits were offered by JL Cooper and are currently offered by Forat Electronics.

Development 
The LinnDrum was designed by the American engineer Roger Linn. His first drum machine, the Linn LM-1, was released in 1980; it retailed for $5,500, making it affordable only to wealthy musicians and studios. Early adopters included Peter Gabriel, Fleetwood Mac and Stevie Wonder, and it became a staple of 1980s pop music, used by acts including the Human League, Gary Numan, Michael Jackson, Giorgio Moroder, ABC, Devo, John Carpenter and particularly Prince. The LinnDrum was cheaper and more widely produced than the LM-1.

References

External links
 Roger Linn Design

Drum machines
Samplers (musical instrument)
Electronic musical instruments
Musical instruments invented in the 1980s